Pamparaptor is an extinct genus of carnivorous deinonychosaur from the late Cretaceous period. It is a basal dromaeosaurid dinosaur with troodontid-like pes which lived during the late Cretaceous period (Turonian to Coniacian stage) in what is now Neuquén province, Patagonia, Argentina. It is known from the holotype MUCPv-1163, an articulated and nearly complete left foot.

The specimen recovered from the Portezuelo Formation (Río Neuquén Subgroup) of Neuquén Group. It was initially considered to be a juvenile specimen of another dromaeosaurid species, Neuquenraptor argentinus. However, it was later re-interpreted as a new genus and named Pamparaptor by Juan D. Porfiri, Jorge O. Calvo and Domenica dos Santos in 2011 and the type species is Pamparaptor micros. The generic name honors Indian Pampas people who lived in central Argentina while "raptor" means "robber" in Latin.

See also

 Timeline of dromaeosaurid research

References

Dromaeosaurs
Late Cretaceous dinosaurs of South America
Coniacian life
Turonian life
Cretaceous Argentina
Fossils of Argentina
Portezuelo Formation
Fossil taxa described in 2011
Taxa named by Jorge O. Calvo